The Roudoule is a  long river that flows through the Alpes-Maritimes department of south-eastern France. It flows into the Var in Puget-Théniers. The Mayola is one of its tributaries.

References

Rivers of France
Rivers of Alpes-Maritimes
Rivers of Provence-Alpes-Côte d'Azur